Manon Houette (born 2 July 1992) is a French handball player for Chambray Touraine Handball and the French national team.

She and competed at the 2015 World Women's Handball Championship and 2016 Olympics. She was named Best Left Winger in the French Division 1 league in 2013–14 and 2014–15 seasons.

Individual awards
French Championship Best Left Wing: 2014, 2015, 2016, 2018
French Championship Hope of the Season: 2013
 All-Star Left Wing of the EHF Champions League: 2019

References

External links

1992 births
Living people
French female handball players
Sportspeople from Le Mans
Expatriate handball players
French expatriate sportspeople in Germany
Olympic handball players of France
Olympic medalists in handball
Olympic silver medalists for France
Medalists at the 2016 Summer Olympics
Handball players at the 2016 Summer Olympics
European champions for France
21st-century French women